The Barsoi–Radhikapur branch line links Barsoi railway station on the Howrah–New Jalpaiguri line to Radhikapur railway station on the Bangladesh–India border.

History
With the partition of India in 1947, the Katihar–Radhikapur section remained in India and the Biral–Parbatipur section was placed in Pakistan (later Bangladesh).

The railway line
When the broad-gauge railway line, instead of being placed at Dalkhola–Malda via Raiganj, was moved to Dalkhola–Barsoi–Malda this section, became only a branch line. This branch line starts at Barsoi railway station and ends at Radhikapur railway station where the Indo-Bangladesh border lies. The Barsoi–Radhikapur sector was converted to broad gauge in 2006. The transit facility in the Radhikapur–Birol sector has remained suspended since 1 April 2005.But now it has been converted to broad gauge and large goods train are travelling with stone boulders from Nepal to Bangladesh through India from March 2017 and it was officially operationalised and announced open in April 2017. The railway track on the Indian side has been converted to  broad gauge while that on the Bangladesh side remains metre gauge.

There are 13 railway stations in this branch line. 10 of them are in Uttar Dinajpur district of West Bengal and the rest are in Katihar district of Bihar.

Stations

References

Katihar railway division
Bangladesh–India border crossings
Railway stations in Uttar Dinajpur district
Railway lines opened in 1889